Aldona Čiukšytė (born 9 February 1944) is a retired Lithuanian rower who won two European titles in the eights event in 1965 and 1967; she finished second in 1966. In 1973 Čiukšytė graduated from the Economics Faculty of Vilnius University and later worked in the food administration in Vilnius.

References

1944 births
Living people
Lithuanian female rowers
Soviet female rowers
European Rowing Championships medalists